Ernie Weckbaugh (born July 1931 in Beverly Hills, California - October 20, 2010) was a former actor and comedian who was an original cast member of the Our Gang comedies, where he played the uncredited role of "Stinkey". He later became a journalist, writing a weekly column for the Los Angeles Daily News.

References

External links

1931 births
2010 deaths
American male child actors
American male journalists
Journalists from California
Male actors from Beverly Hills, California
Comedians from California
20th-century American journalists
20th-century American comedians